Cheng Lianyuan (born December 1961) is a Chinese politician, and current Communist Party Secretary of Kunming, the capital of Yunnan province.  Born in Beijing, Cheng graduated with a degree in engineering at the Beijing University of Technology. He began work as a mechanical factory worker, he then worked in a series of management roles at different companies in the capital. He entered the municipal government to head up the department of Industrial Advancement. Then he became district governor of Chaoyang District, Beijing, then in July 2012 he was named Chaoyang District party chief. In July 2015 he was named party chief of Kunming.

References

1961 births
Living people
People's Republic of China politicians from Beijing
Chinese Communist Party politicians from Beijing
Political office-holders in Yunnan